The Mary Tyler Moore Show, often referred to as Mary Tyler Moore, is an American television sitcom series that aired on CBS from September 19, 1970 to March 19, 1977. Created by James L. Brooks and Allan Burns, the show follows the life of Mary Richards (Mary Tyler Moore), a single woman in her thirties working as the associate producer, later producer, of a local news station WJM. Working at the news station is her gruff boss Lou Grant (Ed Asner), newswriter Murray Slaughter (Gavin McLeod), and the vain and nit-witted anchorman Ted Baxter (Ted Knight). Mary rents a studio apparent from acquaintance and landlady Phyllis Lindstrom (Cloris Leachman), and neighbors her best friend Rhoda Morgenstern (Valerie Harper). Other major characters in the series include Sue Ann Nivens (Betty White), the host of The Happy Homemaker show, and Ted's girlfriend, later wife, Georgette Franklin (Georgia Engel).

Mary Tyler Moore has garnered critical acclaim for its honest and serious portrayal of a single working woman in the 1970s. Since its debut, the series has been nominated for 67 Primetime Emmy Awards (winning 29) and 22 Golden Globe Awards (winning three) among others. Several cast members, including Moore and Asner, have received recognition for their roles, winning several Emmy and Golden Globe awards.

Awards and nominations

Directors Guild of America Awards
Presented by the Directors Guild of America since 1938, The Directors Guild of America Award honors excellence in the field of direction. The Mary Tyler Moore received five nominations for the award for Outstanding Directorial Achievement in Comedy Series, four out of five for work by Jay Sandrich.

Emmy Awards
The Primetime Emmy Award is an annual accolade presented by the Academy of Television Arts & Sciences for outstanding achievement in American prime time television programming. The Primetime Emmy Award recognizes outstanding achievement in aspects such as acting, writing, and direction while the more technical aspects such as cinematography, casting and guest acting performances in television, are awarded at the Creative Arts Emmy Awards. During its tenure, The Mary Tyler Moore Show received 67 nominations - all but five major, winning 29 of them, a record held until Frasier won its 30th Emmy Award in 2002. The show won the award for Outstanding Comedy Series three times for 1975 to 1977. Out of the entire cast, Mary Tyler Moore, Ed Asner, and Valerie Harper received nominations for every year they were on the show. Mary Tyler Moore won the Outstanding Lead Actress in a Comedy Series, known as Outstanding Continued Performance by an Actress in a Leading Role in a Comedy Series in 1971-1973 and Best Lead Actress in a Comedy Series in 1974, three times. Moore also won the Primetime Super Emmy Award for Actress of the Year - Series in 1974. The series won the award for Outstanding Performance by an Actress in a Supporting Role in Comedy six consecutive times from 1971 to 1976. Valerie Harper received the award three times from 1971 to 1973. Cloris Leachman won the award in 1974 and Betty White received the award in 1975 and 1976. Leachman also won the award for Outstanding Single Performance by a Supporting Actress in a Comedy or Drama Series in 1975. Ed Asner won the award for Outstanding Performance by an Actor in a Supporting Role in Comedy three times in 1971, 1972 and 1975 while Ted Knight won the award twice in 1973 and 1976.

Primetime Emmy Awards

Creative Arts Emmy Awards

Golden Globe Awards

Presented since 1949, the Golden Globe Award is an annual accolade awarded by the Hollywood Foreign Press Association for outstanding achievements in film and television. Mary Tyler Moore received 22 nominations during its tenure, winning three awards for Best Actress in a Television Series – Musical or Comedy, awarded to Mary Tyler Moore in 1971, and the award for Best Supporting Actor – Television to Ed Asner in 1972 and 1976.

TV Land Awards
The TV Land Award is an award presented at the eponymous award ceremony, airing on TV Land, that honors television programs that are off air. Receiving 13 nominations since the first award ceremony, The Mary Tyler Moore Show won five awards, including Groundbreaking Show and Broadcaster of the Year, the latter posthumously awarded to Ted Knight three times.

Writers Guild of America Awards

Presented by the Writers Guild of America (WGA), the Writers Guild of America Award is an annual accolade that recognizes outstanding achievement of writers in film, television, radio, promotional writing and videogames. The Mary Tyler Moore Show received 10 nominations of for the award for Television: Episodic Comedy, winning once in 1971.

Other awards

References

External links
 List of Primetime Emmy Awards received by The Mary Tyler Moore Show
 List of awards and nominations received by The Mary Tyler Moore Show at the Internet Movie Database

Mary Tyler Moore Show